Ghulfan is an ethnic group in the Nuba Mountains of Sudan. The number of persons in this group is above 10,000. Their primary language is Ghulfan.

References

External links
 Ghulfan dictionary online from IDS (select simple or advanced browsing)
 Ethnologue

Ethnic groups in Sudan